Cheng Ran is the name of:

Cheng Ran (rower) (born 1977), Chinese rower
Cheng Ran (artist) (born 1981), Chinese artist
Cheng Ran (gymnast) (born 1991), Chinese gymnast who won a gold medal at the 2014 World Artistic Gymnastics Championships